Nalitabari is an upazila of Sherpur District  in the Division of Mymensingh, Bangladesh.

Geography
It has 42698 households and total area 327.61 km2. It is bounded by Meghalaya state of India on the north, Sherpur sadar and Nakla upazilas on the south, Haluaghat upazila on the east, Jhenaigati upazila on the west.

Taragonj bajar is the main populated place in the upazila. Quality hotels and shops are also found here.

Demographics
Par the 2001 Bangladesh census, Nalitabari had a population of 252935; males 128963, females 123972; Muslim 237897, Hindu 10355, Buddhist 4252, Christian 16 and others 415. Indigenous communities such as garo, hajong, Hodi, Mandai and Koch belong to this upazila.

As of the 1991 Bangladesh census, Nalitabari had a population of 226332. Males constituted 50.75% of the population, and females 49.25%. This Upazila's eighteen up population was 103043. Nalitabari had an average literacy rate of 19.5% (7+ years), and the national average of 32.4% literate.

Administration
Nalitabari, primarily formed as a Thana, was turned into an upazila in 1983.

Nalitabari Upazila is divided into Nalitabari Municipality and 12 union parishads: Bagber, Juganiya, Kakorkandhi, Koloshpar, Morichpuran, Nalitabari, Nayabil, Nonni, Puragau, Rajnogor, Ramchondrokura, and Rupnarayankura. The union parishads are subdivided into 108 mauzas and 140 villages.

Nalitabari Municipality is subdivided into 9 wards and 17 mahallas.

See also
Upazilas of Bangladesh
Districts of Bangladesh
Divisions of Bangladesh

References

Upazilas of Sherpur District